Votaw is a surname. Notable people with the surname include:

Carmen Delgado Votaw
Carolyn Harding Votaw (1879–1951), American missionary and public servant
Ty Votaw (born 1962), American lawyer and golf administrator

See also
Votaw, Texas, unincorporated community in the United States